Japan Publishing Industry Foundation for Culture, also known as JPIC, is a non-profit organization based in Chiyoda, Tokyo, and established in 1991.

History 
Japan Publishing Industry Foundation for Culture (JPIC) was founded on March 27, 1991 as a nonprofit corporation with authorization by the Minister of International Trade and Industry (present-day Minister of Economy, Trade and Industry). On April 1, 2012, JPIC became a general incorporated foundation.

Activities 
JPIC works to promote the culture of the publishing industry and encourage lifelong learning through reading through various programs and projects. The foundation researches and carries out surveys, cultivates human resources, collects and shares data, and plans promotional events and campaigns for relevant industries.

Projects 
JPIC Reading Advisor Training Course (1993-present)
JPIC Yomikikase Supporter Course/Experience (1999-present)
Ueno Forest Parent-Child Book Festival (2000-present)
Kono hon yonde! quarterly magazine (2001-present)
JAPAN LIBRARY nonfiction translation series (2014-2021)
English translation series with the Japan Institute of International Affairs (2018-present)
READ JAPAN PROJECT book donation assistance with the Tokyo Foundation for Policy Research (2018-present)
JPIC YOUTH (2018-2021)
JPIC ONLINE (2020-present)

References

External links
Japan Publishing Industry Foundation for Culture homepage
JPIC International homepage
JIIA series
Ueno Forest Parent-Child Book Festival website
JPIC ONLINE website
The Yomiuri Shimbun, Interview with JPIC Director Mr. Nakaizumi
Kanda Kaigo Group, Interview with JAPAN LIBRARY Manager Ms. Asonuma

Book publishing companies of Japan
Series of books